Sarjekot Fortis an old military fortification in India. it is situated very close to the Malvan..It is located in the Arabian Sea close to the Malvan town in Sindhudurg District of Maharashtra state.

History  

The history is similar to the Kolaba fort. This fort was built on the rocks to secure the strategic position.

Major features 

This fort is 26mtX27mt in dimension. There are five bastions and stone wall encircling the fort.. the entrance is facing the Kolaba fort. There is a well inside the fort.

How to reach 
This fort is close to the kulaba fort.

See also
 List of forts in Maharashtra
 List of forts in India
 Sambhaji Maharaj
 Marathi People
 Maratha Navy
 List of Maratha dynasties and states
 Maratha War of Independence
 Battles involving the Maratha Empire
 Maratha Army
 Maratha titles
 Military history of India
 Kanhoji Angre
 Kolaba fort

References 

Buildings and structures of the Maratha Empire
Sea forts
Forts in Raigad district